is a Japanese field hockey player. She competed for the Japan women's national field hockey team at the 2016 Summer Olympics.

References

External links
 

1989 births
Living people
Japanese female field hockey players
Olympic field hockey players of Japan
Field hockey players at the 2016 Summer Olympics
Universiade medalists in field hockey
Field hockey players at the 2014 Asian Games
Universiade bronze medalists for Japan
Asian Games competitors for Japan
Medalists at the 2013 Summer Universiade
21st-century Japanese women